Peritassa killipii is a species of plant in the family Celastraceae. It is endemic to Peru.

References

Endemic flora of Peru
killipii
Vulnerable plants
Taxonomy articles created by Polbot